Robert Hodges, more commonly known by his self-styled moniker Prince Mongo, is an American entrepreneur and minor local political personality in Memphis, Tennessee, who has continuously run for Mayor of Memphis and occasionally for Mayor of Shelby County since the 1970s. He tends to be known locally for his eccentric personality. Though much of his life remains unknown, he claims to have been born on the planet Zambodia around 333 years ago.

Mayoral campaigns and political positions
Prince Mongo has continuously run in every Memphis mayoral election since 1978 as an Independent, sometimes intermittently running for Mayor of Shelby County.

In Mongo's 1983 mayoral election, he announced that president Ronald Reagan had endorsed him. Mongo claimed he got a telegram from Reagan that read "Prince Mongo congratulations on your candidacy for mayor. Mongo, you have my solid support. From Bonzo [a reference to Reagan's Bedtime for Bonzo] to Mongo!" This is most likely untrue.

In the 1991 mayoral election, Prince Mongo got 2,000 votes, effectively putting him in third place. Despite this, he has never acquired any political office in his lifetime.

His recurring campaigns run on unusual proposals, such as the erection of casinos and prisons on Mud Island; the infiltration of sharks into the Mississippi River and Memphis Harbor as to prevent prisoner escapes; as well as weekly public hangings on Court Square that would each be scheduled to be hosted at specifically 3:33 PM. 

In 2018, Prince Mongo expressed criticism for the removal of the Confederate statues of Nathan Bedford Forrest and Jefferson Davis.

Zambodia
Zambodia is a fictional planet that Mongo says he is from. He claims to be an ambassador to Earth, and the savior of Earth's inevitable self-destruction. He left Zambodia during the Stuart Restoration. Prince often does traditions from this fictional planet in public. Zambodia is thought to be a spaceship from what Mongo has said.

Personal life
Prince Mongo, also known as Robert Hodges, is known for his rather eccentric public persona. The details of Prince Mongo's life remain obscure or unknown, though he claims that he is an ambassador from Zambodia where he was born 333 years ago. He claims that he was "sent by the Zambodian spirits" to "save the City of Memphis" and "protect it from natural disasters". He always wears steampunk goggles and a long white wig in public, usually accompanied by flamboyant clothing. His reasoning for his seemingly odd appearance is that he just "damn well wants to".

He first got attention after putting garbage-themed art on his lawn at his Central Gardens home. He decided to run for mayor of Shelby County, Tennessee, and performed well; he then, since 1979, ran for mayor of Memphis, Tennessee and has not performed well.

Properties
Prince Mongo has or had properties in Memphis, Tennessee, Virginia Beach, Virginia, Fort Lauderdale and Port Orange, Florida, and North Carolina.

Mongo owned Ashlar Hall in the 1990s and turned it into a night club. During this time the building received the nickname "Prince Mongo's Castle".

References

Independent politicians in the United States
Year of birth missing (living people)
Living people
People from Memphis, Tennessee